Sonet may refer to:

 Airsport Sonet, a Czech ultralight aircraft
 Sonet Records, European record label
 Sonet Film, production company
 3821 Sonet, asteroid
 Synchronous optical networking (SONET)
 Kia Sonet, a subcompact crossover car model

See also
 Saab Sonett, a 1970s car
 So-net, Japanese internet service provider majority owned by Sony
 Sonnet (disambiguation)